Péronelle can refer to:

 Dame Péronelle (fl. 1292–1319), French herbalist physician
 Peronnelle L'Espicière (fl. 1292–1307), French spice merchant
 Péronelle, Countess of Dreux (1330-1397)